Rudolf Eggenberger (born 5 March 1946) is an Austrian football manager.

External links
 

1946 births
Living people
Austrian footballers
Austrian football managers
Floridsdorfer AC managers
SK Vorwärts Steyr managers
Association footballers not categorized by position